Jason Waterhouse (born 8 November 1991) is an Australian competitive sailor.

He competed at the 2016 Summer Olympics in Rio de Janeiro, in the mixed Nacra 17.

In March 2020 Waterhouse and fellow crew member Lisa Darmanin were selected to represent Australia at the 2020 Summer Olympics in Tokyo. They finished fifth just out of medal contention.

References

External links

1991 births
Living people
Australian male sailors (sport)
Olympic sailors of Australia
Sailors at the 2016 Summer Olympics – Nacra 17
Olympic silver medalists for Australia
Olympic medalists in sailing
Medalists at the 2016 Summer Olympics
Sailors at the 2020 Summer Olympics – Nacra 17
21st-century Australian people